Long Beach, California, held an election for Mayor of Long Beach, California, on April 14, 1998. It saw the reelection of Beverly O'Neill.

Results

References 

Long Beach
Mayoral elections in Long Beach, California
Long Beach